The 1st Midlands M.E.C.C. Formula 2 Race meeting was held on 27 June 1953 at the Silverstone Circuit, Northamptonshire. The race was run to Formula Two regulations, and was held over 6 laps. Tony Crook, driving a Cooper T24-Alta was first, Austen Nurse in an HWM-Alta was second and Charles Headland in a Kieft-Norton was third.

Results

References

Midlands MECC Formula 2 Race
Midlands MECC Formula 2 Race
Midlands MECC Formula 2 Race